Dashaltu (also Romanized as Dāshāltū and Dāsh Āltū; also known as Dāsh Āltī, Gūjeh Lūgeh, and Gūjeh Lūjeh) is a village in Karasf Rural District, in the Central District of Khodabandeh County, Zanjan Province, Iran. At the 2006 census, its population was 56, in 8 families.

References 

Populated places in Khodabandeh County